The Hofuf attack occurred on 29 January 2016 during Friday prayers at Al-Ridha mosque in the Mahasin district of Al Hofuf, Eastern Province, Saudi Arabia. The attack left four people plus the attacker dead and 18 others injured. The attack consisted of a shooting and suicide bombing and was allegedly directed by ISIL. 

The two attackers, Abdurrahman Abdullah Suleiman al-Tuwaijiri (22-year old Saudi citizen) and Talha Hisham Mohammed Abda (Egyptian national), attempted to detonate themselves during Friday prayers at the mosque. Whilst Abdurrahman successfully blew himself up, Talha failed and he was arrested after the attacks.

See also
 List of terrorist incidents in Saudi Arabia
 List of terrorist incidents, January–June 2016
 List of terrorist incidents linked to ISIL

References

Suicide bombings in 2016
ISIL terrorist incidents in Saudi Arabia
Mass murder in 2016
Terrorist incidents in Saudi Arabia in 2016
Suicide bombings in Saudi Arabia
Attacks on Shiite mosques
January 2016 crimes in Asia
Islamic terrorist incidents in 2016
Islamist attacks on mosques
2016 murders in Saudi Arabia